The McKenzie Pass–Santiam Pass Scenic Byway is an  National Scenic Byway in the U.S. state of Oregon. The route is a loop designed to provide a tour of the high Cascade Range northwest of Bend, passing over both McKenzie Pass and Santiam Pass.

Route description
The route begins on its eastern end at the town of Sisters in northern Deschutes County. It follows Oregon Route 126 westward over Santiam Pass south of Three Fingered Jack, then south along the valley of the McKenzie River. It then follows Oregon Route 242 eastward over McKenzie Pass, north of the Three Sisters then back to the town of Sisters. The route is considered a summer tour route, since the road over McKenzie Pass is closed in winter due to snowfall.

History
The McKenzie Pass–Santiam Pass Scenic Byway was designated a National Forest Scenic Byway on February 8, 1989. It was later made an Oregon State Scenic Byway on February 19, 1997 before becoming a National Scenic Byway on  June 9, 1998.

Major intersections

References

External links
 

1989 establishments in Oregon
Cascade Range
Deschutes National Forest
National Forest Scenic Byways
National Scenic Byways
Scenic highways in Oregon
Transportation in Deschutes County, Oregon
Transportation in Linn County, Oregon
Willamette National Forest
U.S. Route 20